James Hardy Fuller (November 28, 1950) is a former professional baseball player. He played two seasons with the Baltimore Orioles and one season with the Houston Astros. He was drafted by the Baltimore Orioles in the 2nd round of the 1970 amateur draft.  In three season he played 107 games and compiled a .194 career batting average with 11 home runs.

References

External links

1950 births
Living people
Major League Baseball outfielders
Baltimore Orioles players
Houston Astros players
People from Bethesda, Maryland
Baseball players from Maryland
San Diego City Knights baseball players
Miami Marlins (FSL) players
Miami Orioles players
Asheville Orioles players
Rochester Red Wings players
Charleston Charlies players
Iowa Oaks players
Omaha Royals players
Columbus Clippers players
International League MVP award winners
Point Loma High School alumni